Neodymium magnets, usually small spheres, have been manufactured as educational toys, stress relief products, and an artistic medium.

In the United States, as a result of an estimated 2,900 emergency room visits between 2009 and 2013 due to either "ball-shaped" or "high-powered" magnets, or both, the U.S. Consumer Product Safety Commission (CPSC) has undergone rulemaking to attempt to restrict their sale.

Controversies

Product positioning controversy
In 2009, a number of US companies decided to repackage sphere magnets and sell them as toys. Despite existing toy regulations at the time, Maxfield & Oberton, maker of Buckyballs, told the New York Times that they saw the product on YouTube and repackaged them as Buckyballs.

Recalls
Buckyballs launched at New York International Gift Fair in 2009 and sold in the hundreds of thousands before the U.S. Consumer Product Safety Commission issued a recall on packaging labeled 13+. According to the CPSC, 175,000 units had been sold to the public. Fewer than 50 were returned. Buckyballs labeled "Keep Away From All Children" were not recalled.

Subsequently, Maxfield & Oberton changed all mentions of "toy" to "desk toy", positioning the product as a stress-reliever for adults and restricted sales from stores that sold primarily children's products.

Further investigation by the CPSC published in 2012 found an increasing trend of magnet ingestion incidents in young children and teens since 2009. Incidents involving older children and teens were unintentional and the result of using the magnets to mimic body piercings such as tongue studs. The commission cited hidden complications if more than one magnet becomes attached across tissue inside the body.

Another recall was issued for Buckyballs in 2012 along with similar products marketed as toys in the US. Recalls and administrative complaints were filed against other similar US companies.  Maxfield & Oberton refused the recall and continued selling their desktop toys.  The company launched a political campaign against the CPSC, and Craig Zucker, the company's co-founder, debated the safety commission on FOX News. On December 27, 2012, Maxfield & Oberton filed a Certificate of Cancellation with the Secretary of State of Delaware, declaring that the company no longer exists.

New standards
In the absence of an existing standard for magnetic products outside of toys, the CPSC issued a new rulemaking proposal in 2012 that purports to ban all loose high-powered magnet sets from being sold across the United States, regardless of their application. The CPSC continues to push forward, actively lobbying medical associations, consumer associations, the press and health agencies outside of the US for support.

On November 22, 2016, United States Court of Appeals for the Tenth Circuit vacated the CPSC's 2012 rule in favor of Zen Magnets LLC, rendering the sale of small neodymium magnets once again legal in the United States. 

On October 6, 2017, the CPSC posted a new petition for magnet safety rulemaking brought forth by Zen Magnets LLC of Colorado. The new magnet safety rule requests that CPSC promulgate a mandatory safety standard that includes the following:
 Performance standards: Require individual magnets and each magnet in a magnet set that fits entirely within the cylinder described in 16 CFR 1501.4 (small parts cylinder) to have a flux index of 50 kG^2 mm^2 or less if the product is designed, marketed, or manufactured for children under the age of 14 years. Establish standards for magnet set packaging, such as requiring packaging to be difficult for children to open and assist users in determining whether all magnets are returned to the package after use. According to the petitioner, these requirements would limit the magnetic strength of magnets so that they would not attach across internal tissue if ingested and would assist users in limiting children's access to the magnets.
 Warning requirements: Require magnet sets to bear warnings that conform to specific form requirements, warn of the ingestion hazard, and indicate the product is not intended for children. Require warnings on product packaging, including in a location that requires a user to see the warning when opening the package.
 Instructional requirements: Require magnet sets to include instructions that indicate how to avoid using the magnet set in a way that can lead to ingesting, aspirating, or inserting the magnets into the body and how to return magnets to the packaging.
 Age restrictions:  Require warnings and instructions for magnet sets to include an age recommendation of 14 years or older.

The CPSC was unable to agree on a new rule, and some manufacturers started selling the products without a warning against use by children. As of 2019, manufacturers are working on a similar voluntary standard at the ASTM.

On October 26, 2017, the CPSC filed an administrative complaint against Zen Magnets, alleging that the magnet sets contained product defects that created a substantial risk of injury to children, declaring that "It is illegal under federal law for any person to sell, offer for sale, manufacture, distribute in commerce, or import into the United States any Zen Magnets and Neoballs."

Safety controversy

The swallowing of small magnets such as neodymium magnetic spheres can result in intestinal injury requiring surgery. The magnets attract each other through the walls of the stomach and intestine, perforating the bowel. The U.S. Centers for Disease Control reported 33 cases as of 2010 requiring surgery and one death. The magnets have been swallowed by both toddlers and teens (who were using the magnets to pretend to have tongue piercings). Defenders of the toy say that the rate of injury is approximately 1 injury per 100,000 Buckyball sets and less than 1 injury per 21.5 million individual magnet pieces. The magnets are marketed to adults, with labels warning of their danger to children.

As a result, Amazon and other retailers agreed to not sell the magnets. As of 2017, however, the magnets were once again available on Amazon.

United States
In June 2012, due to a letter by U.S. Senator Kirsten Gillibrand to U.S. Consumer Product Safety Commission Chairwoman Inez Tenenbaum, the United States Consumer Product Safety Commission filed administrative complaints, attempting to ban the sale of Buckyballs and Zen Magnets. Zen Magnets LLC is the first company to ever receive this sort of complaint without record of injury. In November 2012, Buckyballs announced that they had stopped production due to a CPSC lawsuit.

In March 2016, Zen Magnets (a manufacturer of neodymium magnet spheres) won in a major 2014 court hearing concerning the danger posed by "defective" warning labels on their spherical magnets. It was decided by a DC court (CPSC Docket No: 12-2) that "Proper use of Zen Magnets and Neoballs creates no exposure to danger whatsoever."

As of January 2017, many brands of magnet spheres including Zen Magnets have resumed the sale of small neodymium magnet spheres following a successful appeal by Zen Magnets in the Tenth Circuit US Court of Appeals which vacated the 2012 CPSC regulation banning these products and thereby rendered the sale of small neodymium magnets once again legal in the United States. It was the CPSC's first such loss in more than 30 years.

A study published in the Journal of Pediatric Gastroenterology and Nutrition found a significant increase in magnet ingestions by children after 2017, including "a 5-fold increase in the escalation of care for multiple magnet ingestions".

On June 3, 2020, the CPSC submitted a "Petition Response Staff Briefing Package" to the commission, even after the petition was rescinded. It outlines a desire to conduct research in 2021 with a suggested rule proposal in 2022 for a vote.

Canada
Sales of "certain products with small, powerful magnets" are prohibited in Canada since 2015.

Australia
In November 2012, following an interim ban in New South Wales, a permanent ban on the sale of neodymium magnets went into effect throughout Australia.

New Zealand
In January 2013, Consumer Affairs Minister Simon Bridges announced a ban on the import and sale of neodymium magnet sets in New Zealand, effective from January 24, 2013.

See also
 Geomag
 Magnetix
 Magnext
 Neodymium magnet

References

2000s toys
Construction toys
Executive toys
Toy recalls